Patrick F. Leahy is an American academic administrator serving as the 10th president of Monmouth University. He previously served as the sixth president of Wilkes University from 2012 to 2019.

Early life and education
Leahy is a native of Towson, Maryland. He earned a Bachelor of Arts degree in English from Georgetown University, dual master's degrees in business administration and labor relations from Cornell University, and a Doctor of Education from the University of Pennsylvania.

Career
From 2004 to 2012, Leahy served as the executive vice president of The University of Scranton in Scranton, Pennsylvania. He later served as president of Wilkes University in Wilkes-Barre, Pennsylvania from 2012 to 2019. Since 2019, Leahy has served as the 10th president of Monmouth University in West Long Branch, New Jersey.

References

External links
 

Georgetown University alumni
Cornell University School of Industrial and Labor Relations alumni
University of Pennsylvania Graduate School of Education alumni
University of Scranton faculty
Wilkes University
Samuel Curtis Johnson Graduate School of Management alumni
Heads of universities and colleges in the United States
Living people
Year of birth missing (living people)